Cosmisomopsis viridis is a species of beetle in the family Cerambycidae, the only species in the genus Cosmisomopsis.

References

Compsocerini